Papaccio is an Italian family surname.

The Papaccio surname occurs mostly in Southern Italy, in the Campania region.

The root "Papa" is probably Greek in origin and means "priest" but
also a term of respect. Otherwise this surname derives from "papaccella" a vegetable
similar to the green peperoni.

People
Salvatore Papaccio (1890–1977), Italian singer

External links
Meaning, etymology and history of surname The Papaccio Family

Italian-language surnames